Asadullah Isfahani also known as Assadullah of Isfahan, and Asad Allāh Iṣfahānī (17th century), was an Iranian artisan shamshir (English: saber) swordsmith who dedicated a sword for Shah 'Abbas I of Persia who was taken later by Nader Shah King of Iran. He was renowned worldwide in the arts and skill.

Isfahani's work is in well known museum collections including the Metropolitan Museum of Art, and Victoria and Albert Museum. His son, Ismail ibn Asad Allah Isfahani was also a well known swordsmith.

References

External links 

Swordsmiths
17th-century Iranian people
17th-century people of Safavid Iran